On August 25, 2011, members of drug cartel Los Zetas set a casino on fire in Monterrey, Nuevo León, Mexico, killing 52 people.

The arson attack left over a dozen injured, and over 35 trapped for several hours before the Mexican forces arrived at the place minutes after the incident. Media reports state the majority of those killed were women, including one who was pregnant. Although the government crackdown of the drug cartels dates back to 2006, Monterrey became an increasingly violent city in 2010, due to the rupture of the Gulf Cartel and Los Zetas.

Surveillance footage shows vehicles with armed gunmen arriving at the entrance of Casino Royale. After the gunmen descended from their vehicles, they stormed the casino's main entrance, opened fire on guests, and doused the casino entrances with gasoline and started a fire that trapped people inside. The attack was classified as the most violent and bloodiest in the history of Monterrey and one of the worst in the state of Nuevo León.

Background 
Grupo Royale is a chain of casinos and entertainment venues with branches in Monterrey, Mazatlán and Los Cabos, as well as a branch in Escobedo named "Fantastic Escobedo".

The casino Royale San Jerónimo is at the junction of Calle Jesús María González and Avenida San Jerónimo, and is owned by Mexican, also owners of Conexiones y Mangueras S.A. (Cymsa) and Entertainment Enterprises of México S.A. de C.V. It was opened in November 2007 to more than 500 people, to whom the casino gave a total of two million pesos as a welcoming gift.

The casino had been attacked on several previous occasions. On January 17, 2011, it was announced in the news media that the business had been the victim of organised crime, and that an armed squad had entered the premises to subdue those inside, although this was denied by their then legal representative, Enrique Hernández Navarro. In the early hours of May 25 of the same year, it was attacked by a group of delinquents who detonated firearms, taking money from customers and from the establishment, which was one of several casinos attacked that day.

On May 4, 2011, the casino had been shut down by the municipality for failure to obtain permits for expanding the premises, reopening its doors on May 31 due to an appeal by its owners to the State Tribunal for Administrative Litigation, claiming that the works were for remodelling. This appeal was granted by magistrate José Alfonso Solís Navarro.

Before this tragedy another betting center, owned by Grupo Royale, had been attacked twice during the year by organized crime, but with no casualties.

Attack

Minutes before 2:00 PM on 25 August 2011 in Monterrey, Nuevo León, twelve members of the criminal group Los Zetas, along with one of its leaders, met at "El Gran Pastor" restaurant located on Gonzalitos avenue, just a few blocks away from the casino. The cartel members ate cabrito in a "special meeting," where they were given orders to carry out the attack at the Casino Royale.

According to the perpetrators, the attack was intended to send a message to the owner of the casino for failing to pay an extortion. By 3:00 PM, the Zetas left the restaurant and headed to a Pemex gas station in Valle Verde neighborhood to collect barrels of gasoline. Two separate surveillance videos issued by the governor confirmed that two pick-up trucks arrived at the gas station to fill up big containers of gasoline before setting off on Gonzalitos avenue. While driving through the avenue, the second video captured the moment when the convoy headed towards the site.

The perpetrators arrived at the casino at approximately 3:50 PM in a convoy of four vehicles: a Mini Cooper, a Chevrolet Equinox, a blue GMC and a grey VW Beetle. In the first minute and a half, several armed men, about eight or nine, stormed the casino while some people inside managed to escape. The criminals then ordered the people inside to hurry their way out, but many of them were scared and decided to hide inside the casino. Witnesses claim that one of the gunmen struck the receptionist with his assault rifle before the other triggermen doused the gasoline inside the premise from the tanks they had bought at the gas station.

The crowd of 150 croupiers and customers, mostly women, stampeded inside the casino from the game area to the bathrooms, stairways, and blocked emergency exits. Some of them reportedly heard gunfire and explosion that they thought were grenade detonations. Some people managed to leave through the main entrance, but after a few minutes this became impossible due to the fire spreading; several others were hurt in the stampede, as panic descended on the scene. All of the 52 victims died from suffocation due to carbon monoxide poisoning because they were hiding in bathrooms and offices after trying to escape from the aggressors. It was later confirmed that the emergency exits in the casino were locked.

In only three minutes, the perpetrators burned the establishment and managed to flee the scene – only to be captured by the surveillance video. When the emergency crew finally decided to smash down the walls of the casino, they found the corpses littered in huge piles inside the bathrooms, stairs, and game tables. By the next morning, the Mexican authorities confirmed that 52 people had died, while dozens more were in the hospital.

Reactions
The company Atracciones y Emociones Vallarta S.A. de C.V., whose Administration Council consists of Rodrigo Madero Covarrubias, José Francisco Madero Dávila and Ramón Agustín Madero Dávila, denied any relationship with the Casino Royale, as they had previously separated from each other.

City mayor Fernando Larrazábal Bretón and Juana María Treviño Torres, president of the Tribunal for Administrative Litigation, blamed each other for the tragedy: Larrazábal blamed the tribunal for permitting the casino to reopen, while Treviño Torres blamed Monterrey Civil Protection for not checking that it had emergency exits.

Additionally, magistrate José Alfonso Solís Navarro (who authorized the reopening) resigned his position on August 27.

A contingent of 3,000 soldiers and federal police were sent to the city, and the rest of the state was patrolled by armoured units and Black Hawk helicopters for security reasons. Furthermore, the ex-mayor of Monterrey, Adalberto Madero, was detained by the Attorney General and federal forces for a supposed link to the administrative council of the company believed to manage the Casino Royale.
President Felipe Calderón declared three days of national mourning.

26 relatives of the victimes demanded compensation for the event and for their hospital and funeral expenses to be paid, although the company (through its lawyer Juan Gómez Jaime) denied any responsibility due to the tragedy being out of the company's control. However, the government offered to pay their funeral and legal expenses, educational grants and medical and psychological bills.

On November 7 two casinos belonging to the company  were closed: the Montecarlo in Mazatlán, Sinaloa and the Play Win Casino in Los Cabos, Baja California Sur; however, the company Entretenimiento de México has confirmed that  is no longer a member.

A few days after the attack, the narrative song "El Muerto 53" appeared anonymously in order to "reach the voice of the people".

Suspects 
The attack was attributed to organized crime, with the two initially suspected groups being the Gulf Cartel and Los Zetas who both claimed control of the area. It was later confirmed to be the latter group. With the help of witness statements, portraits of the attackers were drawn. On August 26, three stolen cars were discovered and found to be those caught on camera as being used during the attack. The Attorney General offered 30 million pesos for information leading to the capture of the suspects.

The governor of Nuevo León, Rodrigo Medina de la Cruz, reported that the first five individuals suspected of starting the casino fire were arrested on August 29. The five of them confessed to having participated in the crime which led to 52 deaths, but stated that they had not intended to kill anyone, only wanting to scare the owners of the building because they had refused to pay a weekly fee of 130,000 pesos (roughly US$10,000 to $11,000, Aug 2011) to be allowed to operate. They had decided to attack, but the situation grew out of their control. More gang members were later arrested.

Fugitives 
On September 14 the Sub-Prosecutor for Regional Control of the Attorney General of Mexico, José Cuitláhuac Salinas Martínez, published a list of 18 people involved in the attack, including the identity and photographs of four Los Zetas leaders. Three of them were later captured, and the last one was shot dead on 4 April 2012.

The remainder have only been identified by nicknames and sketch portraits:
 El Monterrey
 La Kitty or La Pelirroja ("The Redhead")
 La Beba
 El Chimpas and/or Chimpa and/or Chilpa
 El Huevo ("The Egg")
 El Tony

Captured

Sentenced 

All of the arrested were detained until their sentencing. On September 27, the minor Alan Enrique was released from the Juvenile Centre as no evidence was found that he was responsible for any part of the attack, despite having been named as a participant by some of the other arrested individuals, although he was later re-arrested.

On October 27, restriction orders were closed on 10 of the 14 who had then been arrested, and the Attorney General of Nuevo León ordered their arrests for homicide and organised criminal activity, having them moved to Topo Chico prison accompanied by a strong security team.

Victims 
The majority of the victims were adults, people over the age of 50 and casino employees. Of the 52 people who died during the attack, ten were men and 42 women, including two pregnant women, one of whom was in her seventh month. 45 of the dead were identified (35 women and ten men) and the rest had to be tested in order to determine their identity as they had suffered severe burns. All of them died from toxic fumes, although seven of the corpses were burned. Most of them were from Monterrey, but two were from Tamaulipas. With respect to the ten injured people, three of them were hospitalised in stable condition.

The victims included Joaquín Martínez, uncle of Silvia Landeros, a well-known television presenter at Multimedios Television, as well as the sister-in-law of ex-footballer Alfredo «Alacrán» Jiménez, whose condition has not been reported.

Altar 
Two months after the attack, family members of the 52 victims came to the scene of the accident to create a memorial with 53 white wooden crosses with the names of the victims, plus one with the word "baby" for the unborn child, as well as leaving a banner asking the president not to forget about the case, referring to the specialist reports allowing the federation to take charge:

Around 50 of the victims' family members joined hands, prayed for the victims and asked for justice. Members of the public also left arrangements of flowers on the pavement outside the casino. And as of 2012, the families have asked the authorities to preserve the casino and keep it intact.

Discrepancies 
Academics and intellectuals disagree strongly about whether or not the Monterrey casino attack was a "terrorist act", a term used by the President of the Republic during a press conference denouncing the killings. Academics define it as a "reprehensible criminal act" and not as an act of terrorism; terrorism has different characteristics, involving ideology and doctrine, such as in the case of ETA or the 2011 attacks in Norway. The criminal acts of drug trafficking and organised crime are not strictly defined in Mexican law, and are usually a form of score-settling between criminal groups, unlike in Colombia where acts of narcoterrorism against the public have a legal definition.

Reactions

National 
 The president of Mexico, Felipe Calderón, called the attacks an act of terrorism and organised crime, and declared three days of national mourning.

Cancelled events 
 Juan Manuel González, president of the seventh International Festival of Cinema in Monterrey, cancelled the red carpet showing of the film Viento en contra, produced and starred in by Bárbara Mori.
 The running of the bulls in the plaza Monumental Monterrey Lorenzo Garza which was celebrating its 74th year, as well as the tribute to ex-bullfighter Eloy Cavazos.

International 
 United States' president Barack Obama called the attack "brutal" and "reprehensible".
 German chancellor Angela Merkel sent her condolences via press conference.
 France condemned the acts as "barbarism which has brutally shaken Mexican society", through its spokesman Bernard Valero.
 President of Costa Rica Laura Chinchilla called it a "cowardly terrorist act".
 President of Panama Ricardo Martinelli invited Latin America to build a "united front" to combat organized crime.

Organizations 
 Secretary-general of the United Nations Ban Ki-moon called it a "deplorable act of violence".
 Amnesty International demanded a detailed investigation of the facts, and declared their solidarity with the victims' families and the inhabitants of the region.

See also
Mexican Drug War
2011–2012 in the Mexican Drug War
Los Zetas
2010 San Fernando massacre
2011 San Fernando massacre
2011 Durango Massacres
Apodaca prison riot
Altamira prison brawl
Coahuila mass graves
Nuevo León mass graves
Resorts World Manila attack, a similar fire attack in a casino in Manila, Philippines.

References

External links
  La Tragedia de el Casino Royale — CNNMéxico
  La violencia, problema estructural más allá de la estrategia de Calderón — CNNMéxico (Video)
 52 Died (reconstructed documentary) — www.eliseortiz.net (Website)

Mexico
Mexico
2011 fires in North America
Arson in Mexico
History of Monterrey
Mass murder in 2011
Battles of the Mexican drug war
Murder in Mexico
Organized crime events in Mexico
Fires in Mexico
2011 murders in Mexico
 
Mexico
21st century in Monterrey
August 2011 crimes
August 2011 events in Mexico
Los Zetas
Human stampedes in 2011
Fire disasters involving barricaded escape routes
2011 disasters in Mexico